Nepal Loktantrik Samajbadi Dal is a political party in Nepal. In the 2008 Constituent Assembly election, the party won 1 seat through the Proportional Representation vote. The party nominated Laxmilal Chaudhary as its representative in the Assembly. The party opposes the demand of the Madhesi political parties for 'One Madhesh, One Pradesh'.

References

Political parties in Nepal